The Sundowners is a 1960  Technicolor comedy drama film that tells the story of a 1920s Australian outback family torn between the father's desires to continue his nomadic sheep-herding ways and the wife's and son's desire to settle down in one place.  The Sundowners was produced and directed by Fred Zinnemann, adapted by Isobel Lennart from  Jon Cleary's 1952 novel of the same name, and starring Deborah Kerr, Robert Mitchum and Peter Ustinov, with a supporting cast including Glynis Johns, Mervyn Johns, Dina Merrill, Michael Anderson Jr. and Chips Rafferty.

The screenplay was adapted by Isobel Lennart from Jon Cleary's 1952 novel of the same name; it was produced and directed by Fred Zinnemann. In 2019, FilmInk cited it among “50  meat pie Westerns”.

At the 33rd Academy Awards, it was in the running for Best Picture, while Kerr was nominated for Best Actress in a Leading Role, Johns for Best Actress in a Supporting Role, Zinnemann for Best Director, and Lennart for Best Writing, Screenplay Based on Material from Another Medium, with no Academy wins.

Plot
Irish-Australian Paddy Carmody (Robert Mitchum) is a sheep drover and shearer, roving the sparsely populated outback with his wife Ida (Deborah Kerr) and son Sean (Michael Anderson Jr.). They are sundowners, constantly moving, pitching their tent whenever the sun goes down. Ida and Sean want to settle down, but Paddy has wanderlust and never wants to stay in one place for long. While passing through the bush, the family meet refined Englishman Rupert Venneker (Peter Ustinov) and hire him to help drive a large herd of sheep to the town of Cawndilla. Along the way, they survive a dangerous bushfire.

Mrs. Firth (Glynis Johns), who runs the pub in Cawndilla, takes a liking to Rupert. He takes to spending nights with her, but, like Paddy, he has no desire to be tied down.

Ida convinces Paddy to take a job at a station shearing sheep; she serves as the cook, Rupert as a wool roller, and Sean as a tar boy. Ida enjoys the company of another woman, their employer's lonely wife, Jean Halstead (Dina Merrill). When fellow shearer Bluey Brown's (John Meillon) pregnant wife Liz (Lola Brooks) shows up unannounced, she sees the young woman through her first birth.

Ida is saving the money the family earns for a down payment on a farm that they stayed at for a night on the sheep drive. Even though Paddy has agreed to participate in a shearing contest against someone from a rival group, he decides to leave six weeks into the shearing season. Ida persuades him to stay. He loses the contest to an old veteran.

Paddy wins a lot of money and a race horse playing two-up. Owning such an animal has been his longstanding dream. They name him Sundowner and enter him, with Sean as his jockey, at local races on their travels after the shearing is done. Sean and Sundowner win their first race.

Ida finally convinces a still reluctant Paddy to buy the farm she and Sean have their hearts set on. However, he loses all the money Ida saved in a single night of playing two-up. By way of apology, he tells her that he has found a buyer for Sundowner if he wins the next race. The money would recoup their down payment. Though Sundowner wins, he is disqualified for interference, and the deal falls through. Nevertheless, Paddy's deep remorse heals the breach with Ida, and they resolve to save enough to buy a farm one day.

Cast

 Deborah Kerr as Ida Carmody
 Robert Mitchum as Paddy Carmody
 Peter Ustinov as Rupert Venneker
 Glynis Johns as Mrs. Firth
 Dina Merrill as Jean Halstead
 Chips Rafferty as Quinlan
 Michael Anderson Jr. as Sean Carmody
 Wylie Watson as Herb Johnson
 John Meillon as Bluey Brown
 Ronald Fraser as Ocker
 Gerry Duggan as Shearer
 Leonard Teale as Shearer
 Dick Bentley as Shearer

Production
Fred Zinnemann decided to make the film at the suggestion of Dorothy Hammerstein, Australian-born second wife of Oscar Hammerstein II. She intended to send him a copy of the novel The Shiralee (later filmed with Peter Finch), but accidentally sent a copy of The Sundowners instead. He immediately bought the screen rights and decided to produce it himself. According to Zinnemann's autography, Aaron Spelling was originally signed to write the screenplay, but was replaced by Isobel Lennart; another source says the screenplay was mostly written by Jon Cleary, in spite of Lennart's screen credit. The ending of the film was a tribute to John Huston's The Treasure of the Sierra Madre. Gary Cooper was hired to play Paddy Carmody, but had to leave due to poor health. He was replaced by Robert Mitchum, who agreed to work on the film for a chance to appear opposite Deborah Kerr, with whom he had become good friends while making Heaven Knows, Mr. Allison together. He also agreed to give her top billing, joking to the production team that they could "design a twenty-four-foot sign of me bowing to her if you like". Michael Anderson, Jr. was imported from England to play their son.

Zinnemann was determined to film The Sundowners on location and vetoed Jack L. Warner's plan to shoot in Arizona or near Dallas, Texas, to save money. Interiors were shot at Associated British Pictures Corp. Elstree Studios in England; exteriors were shot in Australia at Cooma, Nimmitabel, and Jindabyne of New South Wales and in Port Augusta, Whyalla, Quorn, Iron Knob, Hawker and Carriewerloo in South Australia. The "for-sale" property in the film was actually called "Hiawatha" and was on the Snowy River just north of Old Jindabyne (now under the waters of Lake Jindabyne).

Filming began in 1959. Zinnemann spent 12 weeks filming scenery and sheep droving before the cast arrived in October. The weather made location filming difficult, fluctuating from hot and humid to cold and rainy. This delayed production by several weeks and caused some irritation among the cast and crew. Mitchum was often harassed by fans and eventually moved onto a boat to avoid them. Filming wrapped on 17 December 1959. A number of Australian actors appeared in the supporting cast.

Ray Austin was the stunt coordinator. Nicolas Roeg, who would later direct films such as Walkabout, was a second unit camera operator.

Reception
Bosley Crowther called the film an "especially appropriate entertainment for the Christmas holidays"; according to Crowther:
What is nice about these people and valid about this film, is that they have an abundance of freshness, openness and vitality. The action scenes are dynamic—the scenes of driving sheep, shearing them, racing horses at a genuine 'bush country' track and simply living happily in the great sky-covered outdoors. And the scenes of human involvements—those between the husband and the wife, of a woman having a baby, of a footloose housewife looking at a stove—are deeply and poignantly revealing of how good and sensitive people can be.

The Sundowners, marketed as a "newer version" of From Here to Eternity, was a financial failure in the United States. The film reached the top ten at the UK box office and was the third highest grossing film of 1961 in Australia.

Awards

33rd Academy Awards
 Nomination for Best Film
 Nomination for Best Performance by an Actress – Deborah Kerr
 Nomination for Best Performance by an Actress in a Supporting Role – Glynis Johns
 Nomination for Best Achievement in Directing – Fred Zinneman
 Nomination for Best Screenplay Based on Material from Another Medium – Isobel Lennart

Other awards and honours
 New York Film Critics Circle Award for Best Actress – Deborah Kerr
 National Board of Review Award for Best Actor – Robert Mitchum (also for Home from the Hill)
 Named Third Best Film of 1960 by the National Board of Review of Motion Pictures
 Named Fourth Best Film of 1960 by the New York Daily News
 Named one of the Ten Best Films of 1960 by The New York Post, The Saturday Review and the New York World-Telegram

References

External links

 
 
 
 
 
 The Sundowners at Australian Screen Online
The Sundowners at Oz Movies

1960s Australian films
1960 films
1960 Western (genre) films
British adventure films
Films based on works by Jon Cleary
Films about sheep
Films set in the 1920s
Films shot in England
Films directed by Fred Zinnemann
Films scored by Dimitri Tiomkin
Films shot in Flinders Ranges
Australian Western (genre) films
Australian sheep industry
Films shot at Associated British Studios
1960s English-language films
1960s British films